Robert Leonard Arber (born 13 January 1951) is an English former professional footballer who played in the Football League as a defender. 

Arber was born on 13 January 1951 in Poplar, London. He started his footballing career as a youth player with Arsenal before joining Leyton Orient in March 1968. He made 28 League appearances for Orient in the 1972-73 season but could not tie down a place in the first team and went to Southend United on loan, and then to play in South Africa.

After retiring from playing, he worked as a coach at Barking and Woodford Town, and managed Barking between January 1985 and December 1986. He later worked as a youth coach at Tottenham Hotspur and a full-time scout at Arsenal.

Personal life 
Arber is the father of former footballer Mark Arber.

References
General
 . Retrieved 31 October 2013.
 NASLJerseys profile. Retrieved 31 October 2013.
Specific

1951 births
Living people
Footballers from Poplar, London
English footballers
Association football defenders
Arsenal F.C. players
Leyton Orient F.C. players
Southend United F.C. players
Tooting & Mitcham United F.C. players
Barking F.C. players
English Football League players
English expatriate footballers
Expatriate soccer players in the United States
Sacramento Gold (1976–1980) players
American Soccer League (1933–1983) players
Atlanta Chiefs players
North American Soccer League (1968–1984) players
North American Soccer League (1968–1984) indoor players
English football managers
Barking F.C. managers
English expatriate sportspeople in the United States
Tottenham Hotspur F.C. non-playing staff